Hagar and the Angel is a c.1643-1645 oil on canvas painting of a scene from the Book of Genesis by Carel Fabritius, dating from that artist's time in Rembrandt's studio or shortly afterwards. It is now in the Leiden Collection in New York.

Bibliography 
  Bijbelcitaten: Statenvertaling op bijbelsdigitaal.nl
  Duparc, F.J., 2004, Carel Fabritius (1622-1654). Zijn leven en zijn werk, in: Carel Fabritius, 1622-1654, Zwolle, Waanders, p. 32-33
  Seelig, G. & Suchtelen, A. van, 2004, Catalogus, in: Carel Fabritius, 1622-1654, Zwolle, Waanders, p. 85-90 (cat. 2)
 Duparc, F.J., 2006, "Results of the Recent Art-Historical and Technical Research on Carel Fabritius's Early Work", Oud Holland 119 (2006), p. 76-89
 Dominique Surh, 2017, "Hagar and the Angel" (CF-100), in: Arthur K. Wheelock Jr. (ed.), The Leiden Collection Catalogue, New York, 2017

1640s paintings
Paintings by Carel Fabritius
Paintings in the Leiden Collection
Angels in art